Munch Museum, marketed as Munch (stylised as MUNCH) since 2020, is an art museum in Bjørvika, Oslo, Norway dedicated to the life and works of the Norwegian artist Edvard Munch.

The museum was originally located at Tøyen, which was opened in 1963. The museum moved to the new museum building at Bjørvika, which was opened in 22 October 2021.

Selected collection highlights

History

Original museum 

The original Munch Museum was situated at Tøyen in the Oslo borough of Gamle Oslo. Construction of the museum was financed from the profits generated by the Oslo municipal cinemas and opened its doors in 1963 to commemorate what would have been Munch's 100th birthday. Its collection consists of works and articles by Munch, which he donated to the municipality of Oslo upon his death, and additional works donated by his sister Inger Munch, as well as various other works obtained through trades of including duplicate prints.

The museum had in its permanent collection well over half of the artist's entire production of paintings and at least one copy of all his prints. This amounted to over 1,200 paintings, 18,000 prints, six sculptures, as well as 500 plates, 2,240 books, and various other items. The museum also contained educational and conservation sections, and has facilities for the performing arts.

The museum structure was designed by architects Einar Myklebust and Gunnar Fougner. Myklebust also played an important role in the expansion and renovation of the museum in 1994 for the 50th anniversary of Munch's death. This site has also been the location of filming for an Olsenbanden-movie from 1984.

The last exhibition of the museum while at Tøyen, Oslo was opened in May 2021, which lasted until 1 October.

Current museum 

Previously, in 2008, the City of Oslo promoted an architectural competition for a new Munch Museum in the area of Bjørvika, a new urban development where the Oslo Opera House is also located.  The competition was won in 2009 by Spanish architect Juan Herreros and his studio Herreros Arquitectos (now estudio Herreros).

Before the local election in Oslo in 2011, the Oslo Progress Party decided that they would no longer support the project due to economic concerns. After the election, in December 2011, the Oslo City Council voted to end the project. Instead the council wanted to consider improving the current museum or moving the collection to Nasjonalgalleriet.

In May 2013, the Oslo City Council finally took the decision to revive the project, and move the museum to its new site on the waterfront, next to the Oslo Opera House. Construction started during September  2015. The new museum has been widely criticised for its design, where it has been branded the unofficial worlds largest collection of guard rails.

In summer 2021, 28000 pieces of art was moved from the previous museum at Tøyen, to the new museum at Bjørvika, Oslo.

The museum was opened by the King Harald V in October 22 2021.

2004 armed robbery of two paintings 

On Sunday, 22 August 2004, two paintings by Munch, The Scream and Madonna, were stolen from the Munch Museum by armed robbers who forced the museum guards to lie on the floor while they snapped the cable securing the paintings to the wall. The paintings were recovered by Oslo Police on 31 August 2006.

See also
 List of single-artist museums

References

Other sources
Eggum, Arne; Gerd Woll, Marit Lande Munch At The Munch Museum (Scala Publishers, 2005)
Langaard, Johan H. Edvard Munch: Masterpieces from the artist's collection in the Munch Museum in Oslo (McGraw-Hill. 1964)

External links 
Munch-museet website
Munch Museum within Google Arts & Culture

Museums in Oslo
Art museums and galleries in Norway
Modernist architecture in Norway
Art museums established in 1963
1963 establishments in Norway
Biographical museums in Norway
Museums devoted to one artist
Edvard Munch